Czarny wrzesień (Black September) is the third solo album by Polish rapper Peja. The album was released on April 6, 2010. The record company appeared initially to limit its initial release to 2,000 copies, but public interest in Black September resulted in an unlimited edition.

Content

There are a total of sixteen tracks including one in which the Warsaw resident disses rapper Tede that he recorded with after the incident in Zielona Gora where one of Peja's fan was beaten during a concert. Songs "All at My Expense", "TDF (The Dick Fucker)" and "Great Smashing of Tede 3" comes from an EP issued under the name Gang SLU. However, compositions "Counterarguments" and "Say How It Feels" appeared on the second mini-album SLU Gang Fri Peja Kontruje.

Artist comments

The rap star says:
There were circumstances which made the unplanned recordings an album and only because Prince is not my third, but fourth solo album. For the majority of production on the fourth Hirass is responsible with Poznan as manufacturer. The album also has the participation of DJ Decks, which now we take to be "re-education"... It's not so easy to lead beef, when everything you say in an interview or a piece may be used against you in court... Nevertheless, I waited patiently until this matter was completed in order to break the silence and talk about everything from my point of view. Therefore the premiere of "Black September" was dependent on the date of the Zielona court hearing.

Track listing 

 "Przeminęło z wiatrem"/ "Gone With the Wind"† - 2:33
 "Frajerhejt 9.12"/ "Suckerhate 9.12"† - 3:11
 "DTKJ (Dlaczego Tede kurwą jest)"/ "WTIAW (Why There Is a Whore)" - 4:16
 "Czas hardcoru"/ "Time of Hardcore" (produced by DNA) - 6:10
 "Mam bekę"/ "This Makes Me Laugh"† - 4:10
 "Dureń z TVN"/ "Jackass From TVN"† - 5:02
 "Ludzie z mej rzeczywistości"/ "People From My Reality"† - 3:58
 "PEJA vs HIP HOP" (produced by DNA) - 4:19
 "Powiedz jakie to uczucie"/ "Say How It Feels" - 2:46
 "Wszystko na mój koszt"/ "Everything at My Expense" (produced by DJ Decks) - 6:10
 "Kontrargumenty"/ "Counterarguments" - 3:39
 "TDF (The Dick Fucker)" (produced by Magiera) - 7:09
 "Gruby pojazd z Tede 3"/ "Great Smashing of Tede 3"  (produced by DJ. Zel) - 3:36
 "Wrogu mój"/ "My Enemy" (produced by DJ Decks) - 3:58
 "Powiedz jakie to uczucie 2"/ "Say How It Feels 2"† - 3:11
 "Dissulfiran"* - 4:10

† track produced by Hirass

2010 albums
Peja (rapper) albums